Attila Végh (born August 9, 1985) is a Slovak mixed martial artist who competed in the Light Heavyweight divisions of Bellator Fighting Championships and Konfrontacja Sztuk Walki (KSW). He won the Bellator 2012 Summer Series Light Heavyweight Tournament and then the Bellator Light Heavyweight Championship. After losing it in his first defense, he was released from the promotion. A professional competitor since 2008, he has also competed for M-1 Global. Now coach of UFC fighters Ľudovít Klein and Martin Buday in Spartakus Fight Gym, Trnava.

Early life
Végh was born on August 9, 1985, in Dunajská Streda, Slovakia. Growing up in Gabčíkovo he started wrestling at the age of 5 up until the age of 16 when he switched to Kempo Karate. He became a successful Kempo Karate practitioner and won a number of titles including one world title, one European title and won the Hungarian kempo karate championships in his division 14 times.

Mixed martial arts career

Early career

Végh made his professional MMA debut in Slovakia in March 2008.  For the first year of his career, he was undefeated with a record of 9 wins and no losses.

In May 2009, Végh debuted for the KSW promotion in Poland and encountered his first professional loss by decision to Lukasz Jurkowski. In February 2010, Végh had the most important bout in his life when he faced Aleksander Radosavljevic in the title match of Noc Skorpiona 6 (an MMA tournament held in Karlovac, Croatia), where he won by split decision in Round 3. This made him become European MMA champion under World Free Fight Association. This was the main reason why he got a contract with Bellator through his manager Zvonimir Brala later on.

Over the next three years, Végh continued fighting for various promotions all over Central Europe.  Following the loss to Jurkowski, he added to his record with 15 more wins, 3 losses, and 2 draws. Notable wins include highly touted Marcus Vanttinen and Jonas Billstein.

Bellator Fighting Championships
In late 2011, it was announced that Végh had been signed by Bellator MMA to fight in their Light Heavyweight division.

Végh made his Bellator debut in April 2012.  He defeated Dan Spohn via split decision at Bellator 66.

In the summer of 2012, Végh entered Bellator's Light Heavyweight tournament. In the opening round at Bellator 71, he faced Zelg Galesic and won via submission a minute into the first round. Végh faced Emanuel Newton in the semifinals at Bellator 72. He won the fight via controversial split decision. He faced Travis Wiuff in the tournament finals at Bellator 73 on August 24, 2012. Végh won in impressive fashion, getting a KO victory just 25 seconds into the first round. With the win, he earned the chance to face Bellator Light Heavyweight World Champion Christian M'Pumbu at Bellator 91 on February 28, 2013. He won the Bellator Light Heavyweight Championship belt via unanimous decision.

Végh was expected to face Emanuel Newton in a rematch at Bellator 106, but pulled out of the bout and was replaced by Muhammed Lawal.

Végh faced Interim Bellator Light Heavyweight champion Emanuel Newton in a title unification bout at Bellator 113 on March 21, 2014. He lost the fight via split decision.

On August 25, 2014, Végh was released from Bellator, along with twelve other fighters.

M-1 Global
Végh signed with M-1 and his next fight will be against Viktor Nemkov at the M-1 Challenge 71 on 21 October 2016.

Championships and accomplishments

Bellator Fighting Championships
Bellator Light Heavyweight Championship (One time)
Bellator 2012 Summer Series Light Heavyweight Tournament Winner

Mixed martial arts record

|-33-9-2
|Win
|align=center|33–9–2
|Karlos Vemola
|KO (punch)
|Oktagon 15
|
|align=center| 1
|align=center| 2:07
|Prague, Czech Republic
| 
|-
|Loss
|align=center|32–9–2
|Virgil Zwicker
|KO (punches)
|Oktagon 12
|
|align=center| 1
|align=center| 3:18
|Bratislava, Slovakia
| 
|-
|Win
|align=center|32–8–2
|Maiquel Falcão
|Decision (unanimous)
|Oktagon 10
|
|align=center| 3
|align=center| 5:00
|Prague, Czech Republic
|
|-
|Win
|align=center|31–8–2
|Travis Fulton
|Submission (arm-triangle choke)
|Oktagon 4: Challenge Finals 2
|
|align=center| 1
|align=center| 3:23
|Bratislava, Slovakia
|
|-
|Win
|align=center|30–8–2
|Paul Byrne
|Decision (unanimous)
|Oktagon 3: Open Air
|
|align=center| 3
|align=center| 5:00
|Prague, Czech Republic
|
|-
|Loss
|align=center|29-8–2
|Viktor Nemkov
|Decision (unanimous)
|M-1 Challenge 71: Nemkov vs. Vegh
|
|align=center| 3
|align=center| 5:00
|St. Petersburg, Russia
| 
|-
|Loss
|align=center|29–7–2
|Alexander Volkov
|KO (punches)
|M-1 Challenge 68: Shlemenko vs. Vasilevsky 2
|
|align=center| 1
|align=center| 2:38
|Moscow, Russia
| Pre M-1 Global Heavyweight Championship.
|-
|Loss
|align=center|29–6–2
|Goran Reljić
|Decision (split)
|KSW 31
|
|align=center|3
|align=center|5:00
|Gdańsk, Poland
|<small>KSW Light Heavyweight Championship.
|-
|Loss
|align=center|29–5–2
|Emanuel Newton
|Decision (split)
|Bellator 113
|
|align=center|5
|align=center|5:00
|Mulvane, Kansas, United States
|
|-
|Win
|align=center|29–4–2
|Christian M'Pumbu
|Decision (unanimous)
|Bellator 91
|
|align=center|5
|align=center|5:00
|Rio Rancho, New Mexico, United States
|
|-
|Win
|align=center|28–4–2
|Travis Wiuff
|KO (punches)
|Bellator 73
|
|align=center|1
|align=center|0:25
|Tunica, Mississippi, United States
|
|-
|Win
|align=center|27–4–2
|Emanuel Newton
|Decision (split)
|Bellator 72
|
|align=center|3
|align=center|5:00
|Tampa, Florida, United States
|
|-
|Win
|align=center|26–4–2
|Zelg Galešić
|Submission (rear naked choke)
|Bellator 71
|
|align=center|1
|align=center|1:00
|Chester, West Virginia, United States
|
|-
|Win
|align=center|25–4–2
|Dan Spohn
|Decision (split)
|Bellator 66
|
|align=center|3
|align=center|5:00
|Cleveland, Ohio, United States
|
|-
|Win
|align=center|24–4–2
|Jonas Billstein
|Submission (triangle choke)
|Heroes Gate 4
|
|align=center|3
|align=center|N/A
|Prague, Czech Republic
|
|-
|Win
|align=center|23–4–2
|Grigor Aschugbabjan
|TKO (retirement)
|KSW 16
|
|align=center|2
|align=center|0:26
|Gdańsk, Poland
|Catchweight (207 lbs) bout.
|-
|Win
|align=center|22–4–2
|Marcus Vänttinen
|Decision (unanimous)
|Rock and Brawl
|
|align=center|3
|align=center|5:00
|Kouvola, Finland
|
|-
|Win
|align=center|21–4–2
|Baga Agaev
|TKO (corner stoppage)
|Heroes Gate 3
|
|align=center|3
|align=center|N/A
|Prague, Czech Republic
|
|-
|Draw
|align=center|20–4–2
|Hans Stringer
|Draw (unanimous)
|Nitrianska Noc Bojovnikov III: Ring of Honor
|
|align=center|2
|align=center|5:00
|Nitra, Slovakia
|
|-
|Loss
|align=center|20–4–1
|Simon Carlsen
|TKO (punches)
|Heroes Gate 2
|
|align=center|2
|align=center|2:40
|Prague, Czech Republic
|
|-
|Win
|align=center|20–3–1
|Jevgenij Lapin
|Submission (triangle-armbar)
|Nitrianska Noc Bojovnikov: Ring of Honor
|
|align=center|1
|align=center|4:33
|Nitra, Slovakia
|
|-
|Win
|align=center|19–3–1
|Egidijus Valavičius
|Decision (unanimous)
|Heroes Gate 1
|
|align=center|2
|align=center|5:00
|Prague, Czech Republic
|
|-
|Draw
|align=center|18–3–1
|Adlan Amagov
|Draw (unanimous)
|Azerbaijan Pankration Federation: Azerbaijan vs. Europe
|
|align=center|3
|align=center|5:00
|Baku, Azerbaijan
|
|-
|Loss
|align=center|18–3
|Daniel Tabera
|Submission (kneebar)
|KSW 13
|
|align=center|1
|align=center|4:57
|Katowice, Poland
|
|-
|Win
|align=center|18–2
|Łukasz Skibski
|TKO (knees)
|KSW 13
|
|align=center|1
|align=center|4:53
|Katowice, Poland
|
|-
|Win
|align=center|17–2
|Kristof Nataska
|KO (soccer kicks)
|KO Boxing Club Galanta: ODPLATA
|
|align=center|1
|align=center|N/A
|Šaľa, Slovakia
|
|-
|Win
|align=center|16–2
|Boris Tonkovic
|TKO (punches)
|Den Gladiatora 7
|
|align=center|1
|align=center|0:50
|Bratislava, Slovakia
|
|-
|Win
|align=center|15–2
|Aleksandar Radosavljevic
|Decision (unanimous)
|Noc Skorpiona 6
|
|align=center|3
|align=center|5:00
|Karlovac, Croatia
|
|-
|Win
|align=center|14–2
|Igor Henc
|TKO (punches)
|Total FC: TotalFight
|
|align=center|1
|align=center|3:30
|Hungary
|
|-
|Loss
|align=center|13–2
|Toni Valtonen
|Decision (split)
|Shooto Finland: Helsinki Fight Night
|
|align=center|3
|align=center|5:00
|Helsinki, Finland
|
|-
|Win
|align=center|13–1
|Arnoldas Joknys
|TKO (submission to punches)
|Noc Bojov 1
|
|align=center|1
|align=center|1:11
|Nitra, Slovakia
|
|-
|Win
|align=center|12–1
|Aslambek Saidov
|Submission (triangle-armbar)
|Kings of the Ring: Return of Gladiators
|
|align=center|2
|align=center|2:23
|Brno, Czech Republic
|
|-
|Win
|align=center|11–1
|Lubos Suda
|Submission (armbar)
|Hell Cage 4
|
|align=center|1
|align=center|1:30
|Prague, Czech Republic
|
|-
|Win
|Align=center|10–1
|Gustav Dietz
|TKO (punches)
|It's Showtime: Budapest
|
|align=center|1
|align=center|1:13
|Budapest, Hungary
|
|-
|Loss
|align=center|9–1
|Lukasz Jurkowski
|Decision (unanimous)
|KSW 11
|
|align=center|2
|align=center|5:00
|Warsaw, Poland
|
|-
|Win
|align=center|9–0
|Sebastian Hercun
|TKO (submission to punches)
|Fight Stage Championship 3
|
|align=center|1
|align=center|2:41
|Košice, Slovakia
|
|-
|Win
|align=center|8–0
|Markus Wagner
|Submission (arm-triangle choke)
|Free Fight Championship: On Tour
|
|align=center|1
|align=center|1:33
|Jena, Germany
|
|-
|Win
|align=center|7–0
|Lukas Turecek
|KO (punches)
|Hell Cage 3
|
|align=center|1
|align=center|0:12
|Prague, Czech Republic
|
|-
|Win
|align=center|6–0
|Zsolt Zathureczky
|Decision (unanimous)
|Vendetta
|
|align=center|2
|align=center|5:00
|Csongrád, Hungary
|
|-
|Win
|align=center|5–0
|Markus Di Gallo
|Decision (unanimous)
|Fight Stage Championship 2
|
|align=center|3
|align=center|5:00
|Bratislava, Slovakia
|
|-
|Win
|align=center|4–0
|Martin Wojcik
|Submission (armbar)
|Hell Cage 2
|
|Align=center|2
|align=center|4:29
|Prague, Czech Republic
|
|-
|Win
|Align=center|3–0
|Matyas Levante
|TKO (punches)
|Total FC: TotalFight
|
|align=center|1
|Align=center|0:55
|Pest, Hungary
|
|-
|Win
|align=center|2–0
|Matej Turcan
|TKO (submission to punches)
|Fight Stage Championship 1
|
|align=center|2
|align=center|1:46
|Košice, Slovakia
|
|-
|Win
|align=center|1–0
|Matej Turcan
|Submission (armbar)
|Top X-Fight 2: In the Middle of Nowhere
|
|align=center|1
|align=center|4:35
|Žilina, Slovakia
|
|-

References

External links

1985 births
Living people
Sportspeople from Dunajská Streda
Slovak male mixed martial artists
Hungarians in Slovakia
Sportspeople from Bratislava
Slovak male karateka
Slovak practitioners of Brazilian jiu-jitsu
Mixed martial artists utilizing American Kenpo
Bellator MMA champions
Light heavyweight mixed martial artists
Heavyweight mixed martial artists